Eva Lubbers (born 6 February 1992 in Uithoorn) is a Dutch athlete.

Biography
She who competes in the sprint and high jump with a personal best time of 11.58 sec. at the 100 metres and 23.51 sec. at the 200 metres event.

Lubbers won the silver medal at the 2012 European Athletics Championships in Helsinki at the 4 × 100 m relay.

External links 
 

1992 births
Living people
Dutch female sprinters
Dutch female high jumpers
Athletes (track and field) at the 2012 Summer Olympics
European Athletics Championships medalists
Olympic athletes of the Netherlands
People from Uithoorn
Sportspeople from North Holland
21st-century Dutch women